Martin Bédard (born March 23, 1984) is a Canadian football long snapper who is currently a free agent. He most recently played for the Edmonton Elks  of the Canadian Football League (CFL). Previously, he played for 11 seasons and 179 games for the Montreal Alouettes. He is a two-time Grey Cup champion having won in 2009 and 2010.

College career
Bédard played college football for the UConn Huskies.

Professional career
Bédard was drafted by the Montreal Alouettes in the second round of the 2009 CFL Draft.

On February 4, 2019, Bédard signed a contract extension with Montreal. He played in 16 regular season games in 2019 as the team's longsnapper and won the Jake Gaudaur Veterans' Trophy that year. He did not play in 2020 due to the cancellation of the 2020 CFL season.

On July 1, 2021, Bédard announced his retirement from professional football. However, he came out of retirement later that year when it was announced on October 11, 2021 that he had signed with the Edmonton Elks. He played in six games for the Elks in 2021 and was released on December 28, 2021.

References

External links
Edmonton Elks bio 
UConn Huskies bio

1984 births
Living people
Canadian football long snappers
Canadian players of American football
UConn Huskies football players
Edmonton Elks players
Montreal Alouettes players
Players of Canadian football from Quebec
Sportspeople from Laval, Quebec